Molly Stark, née Elizabeth Page (February 16, 1737 – June 29, 1814) was the wife of General John Stark, made famous by his battle cry during the American Revolutionary War. Described as "mother of 11 children, homemaker, patriot, and defender of the household", there are locations and landmarks named for her in at least four states.

Biography
Elizabeth Page was born in Haverhill, Massachusetts, on February 16, 1737, to Puritans Caleb Page and Elizabeth Merrill. Her father was "a successful merchant, militia captain, and surveyor." Her mother died when she was five, and she was adopted by her aunt, Ruth Wallingford, a widow with 10 children of her own. She spent 10 years with the Wallingfords, then returned to live with her father in Starkstown (current Dunbarton, New Hampshire) in 1752 at the age of 15. Her father owned slaves, which was not common in New Hampshire. She married John Stark on August 20, 1758; it was apparently John Stark who gave his wife the nickname of "Molly". Together they had 11 children, including their eldest son, Caleb Stark.

Molly Stark gained historical notoriety due to her husband's battle call of "There are your enemies, the Red Coats and the Tories. They are ours, or this night Molly Stark sleeps a widow!" before engaging with the British and Hessian army in the Battle of Bennington. Stark is also known for her success as a nurse to her husband's troops during a smallpox epidemic and for opening their home as a hospital during the war. In late November 1778, she petitioned the New Hampshire Court "praying for leave to inoculate herself and family for the Small Pox," but her request was denied by authorities who feared it could spread the disease. She died on June 29, 1814, and was interred in Manchester, New Hampshire.

Legacy
Molly Stark's name remains in popular use on "a dizzying array of schools, parks, streets and businesses of every description bearing her name", "for reasons never fully explained by anyone".

Vermont
Stark is honored in Vermont by the Molly Stark State Park in Wilmington, and a statue of Stark holding a child and musket in downtown Wilmington near the Deerfield River. Also named for her is the Molly Stark Trail, otherwise known as Route 9, which crosses southern Vermont and commemorates the route used by General Stark on his victory march home from the Battle of Bennington. There is also a Molly Stark Elementary School in Bennington. Molly Stark Mountain is one of the Green Mountain peaks on the Long Trail, just south of Camel's Hump and north of Route 17; the adjacent peak is Baby Stark.

New Hampshire
The Molly Stark House still stands in Dunbarton at Page's Corner, denoted by a New Hampshire historical marker (number 111); it was added to the New Hampshire State Register of Historic Places in 2003. The Molly Stark cannon, or "Old Molly", bears her name, and is kept by the New Boston Artillery Company, denoted by a New Hampshire historical marker (number 146). The Molly Stark Chapter of the Daughters of the American Revolution is located in Manchester.

Ohio
Numerous revolutionary war veterans settled in Ohio, so the General and his wife were honored there. Molly Stark Park is located in Nimishillen Township, Stark County, in northeastern Ohio. It is the grounds of the former Molly Stark Hospital, which served as a tuberculosis sanatorium between 1929 and 1956 and as a general hospital and geriatric facility until 1995. In 2008, the county park board offered to buy the hospital and its grounds for a dollar, and the county opened the first public park in the township in April 2009.

Minnesota
Molly Stark Lake in Otter Tail County, Minnesota, is named for her.

Notes

References

External links
Molly Stark Sanatorium at abandonedonline.net
Molly Stark State Park at Vermont State Parks
Molly Stark House Historical Marker at hmdb.org

Women in the American Revolution
People of colonial New Hampshire
People of New Hampshire in the American Revolution
People from Haverhill, Massachusetts
1737 births
1814 deaths
People from Dunbarton, New Hampshire